Ryan Mark Jones (born 23 May 2002) is an English footballer who plays as a defender or midfielder for Hungerford Town on loan from Bristol Rovers.

Career
Jones broke through at Weston-super-Mare during the 2019–20 season, being named on the bench for a large proportion of fixtures. On 26 October 2019, Jones scored his first senior goal in a 3–2 FA Trophy defeat to AFC Totton. His goal in the 6th minute of extra time gave his side a 2–1 lead before Totton responded twice to win the match and progress. His first league goal came in February 2020 with the fifth goal in a 5–0 thrashing of Wimborne Town.

On 16 October 2020, Jones joined League One side Bristol Rovers for an undisclosed fee on a three-year deal before immediately being loaned back to Weston-super-Mare for the season.

Jones enjoyed somewhat of a breakthrough pre-season heading into the 2021–22 season and on 10 August 2021, made his debut when he came off of the bench in a 2–0 EFL Cup defeat to Cheltenham Town. He scored his first goal for the club in a 5–3 EFL Trophy defeat to Exeter City, also assisting his side's third goal.

On 18 February 2022, Jones joined National League South side Bath City on a one-month loan deal, making his debut the following day in a 2–0 defeat to Dartford. On 21 March, this loan was extended until the end of the season.

On 26 September 2022, Jones signed for National League South club Hungerford Town on a one-month loan deal.

Career statistics

References 

2002 births
Living people
English footballers
Association football defenders
Weston-super-Mare A.F.C. players
Bristol Rovers F.C. players
Bath City F.C. players
Hungerford Town F.C. players
Southern Football League players
National League (English football) players